A number of ships of the Royal Navy have borne the name HMS Diligence.

 was an eight-gun sloop built in 1756, renamed Comet and converted to a fireship in 1779, but sold that year.
 was an 18-gun brig sloop. Originally HMS Spencer, she was renamed HMS Diligence before being launched in 1795. She was lost in 1800.
 was the former mercantile Union, purchased in 1801 and sold in 1812.
 was part of Inglefield’s 1854 Arctic expedition.
HMS Diligence was a 17-gun  laid down in 1861 but cancelled on 12 December 1863.
 was a destroyer depot ship, formerly the civilian Tabaristan, purchased in October 1915. She was scrapped in 1926.
 was a repair ship, formerly USS Diligence (BAR-18) was transferred under terms of the Lend-lease Act to the Royal Navy and returned to the US Navy in 1946. 
  was a base at Hythe, Hampshire for the minesweepers and motor torpedo boats of the reserve fleet, which opened in 1953.
  fleet repair ship of the Royal Fleet Auxiliary, formerly the civilian MV Stena Inspector, purchased in October 1983.

Royal Navy ship names